Shades of Rock is the eighth rock album by British instrumental (and sometimes vocal) group The Shadows, released in 1970 through Columbia (EMI).

Track listing

Personnel
Hank Marvin - Lead and rhythm guitar
John Rostill - Bass guitar
Brian Bennett - Drums and percussion
Alan Hawkshaw - Piano, organ and electric piano
Extra Musicians
Dave Richmond - Bass guitar
Herbie Flowers - Bass guitar
Brian Odgers - Bass guitar
Cover Photo by Alan Wilmoth
Peter Vince - Producer

Charts

References 

1970 albums
EMI Columbia Records albums
The Shadows albums
Instrumental albums